Eretmichthys pinnatus is a species of cusk-eel found in the ocean depths from  in the Indo-Pacific from Sulawesi and Japan to western coast of Colombia. This species grows to a length of  SL.  It is the only known member of its genus.

References

Ophidiidae
Monotypic fish genera
Fish described in 1899